Bonsecours is a commune in the Seine-Maritime department in the Normandy region in northern France.

Geography
A southern residential suburb of Rouen situated at the junction of the D6014, D6105 and the D95 roads. A little light industry takes place by the banks of the river Seine, the commune's westerly border.

Heraldry

Population

Places of interest
 The Basilique Notre-Dame de Bonsecours, dating from the nineteenth century.
 An eighteenth-century Château de Bagnères.
 Vestiges of Saint-Michel's priory.
 The World War I Belgian Military Cemetery and memorial.
 Remains of fortifications dating from the eighth century onwards.
 The Côte Sainte Catherine offering panoramic views of Rouen, the Seine, and neighbouring communes and suburbs, and a natural environment containing numerous relatively rare flora and fauna in the chalk meadows on the hillside.

The Servant of God, Reverend Father Jacques Hamel, murdered by ISIS in July 2016, is buried in Bonsecours.

Notable people
 Anny Duperey, French actress, was born here.
 José-Maria de Heredia (1842–1905), a poet, is buried here.

See also
Communes of the Seine-Maritime department

References

External links

Official website of Bonsecours 
Normandy Then and Now at Bonsecours - English website with excellent interior photographs and historic images of the stunning gothic church and monument to Joan of Arc.

Communes of Seine-Maritime